Westwind Children's Services is a nonprofit operator of several charter schools in the state of Arizona, founded in 1996. It opened its first school, Westwind Preparatory Academy high school, in 1998. The CEO and superintendent of the schools is Debra Slagle.

Schools

WCS charter
Westwind Preparatory Academy (1998)
Westwind Prep at Anthem (high school, 2010)
Westwind Middle School (2000)

Affiliated but under different charters
Park View Middle School (1999)
Canyon View Preparatory Academy (2010)
Caurus Academy (Anthem)

References

External links
Official website

Education in Arizona